Troy University at Dothan is a satellite campus of Troy University and is located in Dothan, Alabama.

The campus has its roots in extension courses offered at Fort Rucker, Alabama in the 1950s. A separate Troy State College teaching center was established at Fort Rucker in the 1960s, which led to the creation of the present-day Dothan Campus. In 1982, the Montgomery and Dothan campuses were granted independent accreditation, and the Troy State University System was formed. In April 2004, "State" was dropped from the University's name to reflect the institution's new, broader focus. In August 2005, all Troy campuses were reunified under one accreditation.

References

http://www.troy.edu

External links
 Troy University Dothan campus

Dothan
Public universities and colleges in Alabama
Educational institutions established in 1965
Satellite campuses
Dothan, Alabama
1965 establishments in Alabama